Andromeda is a progressive metal band from Sweden formed in 1999. They are currently signed to Massacre Records, Replica Records and Avalon/Marquee. The style emphasizes on strong keyboards and technical drumming. The band is also well known for the vocals of David Fremberg.

They have recorded five albums as of 2011, as well as a live DVD. There are two versions of their first album, Extension of the Wish. The original recording features their first vocalist Lawrence Mackrory. The second version has all of the original instrument tracks, but with their replacement vocalist David Fremberg. The most recent album Manifest Tyranny was released in 2011.

In 2016 they released their second live DVD "Live in Vietnam", which was then made available to see on YouTube in 2020.

Line-up
Johan Reinholdz – guitar (also in Nonexist, Opus Atlantica, Skyfire, Dark Tranquillity)
David Fremberg – vocals (also in Bloom)
Thomas Lejon – drums (also in A.C.T, ex-Embraced, ex-Ominous)
Martin Hedin – keyboards
Linus "Mr. Gul" Abrahamson – bass

Former members
Lawrence Mackrory – vocals (also in Seethings, ex-Darkane, Enemy Is Us)
Gert Daun – bass
Fabian Gustavsson – bass

Discography
Extension of the Wish - (2001, Century Media)
II=I (Two Is One) (2003, Century Media)
Extension of the Wish - Final Extension (Compilation) (2004)
Chimera (2006, Massacre Records)
Playing Off the Board (Live DVD) (2007, Metal Mind Productions)
The Immunity Zone (2008, Nightmare Records)
Manifest Tyranny (2011, Inner Wound Recordings)
Live in Vietnam (Live DVD) (2016, Andromeda Rec.)

References

Independent Music Awards winners
Musical groups established in 1999
Swedish progressive metal musical groups
1999 establishments in Sweden
Massacre Records artists
Century Media Records artists